Power of Three  may refer to:
 Power of three, a number of the form 3
 Third power, a number of the form n
 Power of Three (novel), a novel by Diana Wynne Jones
 Power of Three (Fatso Jetson album)
 Power of Three (Michel Petrucciani album)
 Power of Three (Charmed)
 "The Power of Three" (Doctor Who)
 "The Power of Three", an episode of Teenage Mutant Ninja Turtles
 "The Power of Three", a 2013 episode of Ancient Aliens
 Warriors: Power of Three, an arc in the fantasy novel series Warriors by Erin Hunter
 The Power of Three, a music album by Monte Pittman